Mon amy is a vinyl album by Ensemble Renaissance, released in 1985 on the PGP RTB label, Ensemble's fourth album overall. It is a compilation of the Renaissance tunes from various styles: Spanish Renaissance music from the Cancionero de Palacio, Elizabethan music from the William Shakespeare's theatre and works by John Dowland, Franco-Flemish School, pieces from the most famous dance collections of Tielman Susato, Michael Praetorius and Claude Gervaise. Mon amy owes its name to the rondeau from Susato's collection Danserye.
The material from this LP also appears on their German CD Anthology in the remastered form.

Track listing
All tracks produced by Ensemble Renaissance

Personnel
The following people contributed to the Mon Amy

Dragana Jugović del Monaco – mezzo-soprano
Miroslav Marković – baritone
Dragan Mlađenović – tenor, crumhorns, sopranino recorder, rauschpfeife, jew's harp
Georges Grujić – recorders, sopranino rauschpfeife, bass crumhorn, soprano/bass cornamuse, tenor rackett
Dragan Karolić – recorders, tenor/bass cornamuse
Marko Štegelman – bagpipes
Miomir Ristić – fiddle, rebec, percussion instruments
Vladimir Ćirić – vielle, rebec, percussion instruments
Svetislav Madžarević – lute, percussion instruments

External links
Album on Discogs

1985 albums
Ensemble Renaissance albums